Petko Chobanov (born April 20, 1956) (in Bulgarian: Петко Чобанов) is the president of Burgas Free University, chairman of the board of trustees of BFU., and editor-in-chief of Bulgarian Journal of Business Research.

References

Heads of universities in Bulgaria
Living people
Place of birth missing (living people)
1956 births